The 11th Regiment of Militia was raised in October 1739 by the governor of the colony of Connecticut to provide an overarching organization of military units within the colonies. These regiments served as part of the Continental Army during the American Revolutionary War. The regiment contributed many of its forces to regular regiments in the Continental Army.

Prior to the Revolutionary War, the regiment consisted of companies from Plainfield, Canterbury, Pomfret, Killingly, and Voluntown. During the Revolutionary War, the companies were from Pomfret, Woodstock, and Killingly.

References

External links
Grenadier Company of the 11th Connecticut Militia
Bibliography of Connecticut's participation in the Continental Army compiled by the United States Army Center of Military History

11th Regiment of Militia (Connecticut)
Military units and formations established in 1739
Connecticut regiments of the Continental Army
Military in Connecticut
1739 establishments in the Thirteen Colonies